Yangsan Stadium is a stadium in Yangsan, South Korea.  It is currently used mostly for football matches. The stadium holds 22,061 spectators and opened in 2002.

References

Football venues in South Korea
Yangsan
Venues of the 2002 Asian Games
Asian Games football venues